Parliamentary elections were held in Slovakia on 5 March 2016 to elect the 150 members of the National Council. The ruling left-wing populist Direction – Social Democracy (SMER–SD) party remained the strongest party, but lost its majority. The Slovak Democratic and Christian Union – Democratic Party (SDKÚ-DS), which led the government between 2000–06 and 2010–12, was defeated heavily, failing to cross the electoral threshold and losing its representation in the National Council. The centre-right Christian Democratic Movement (KDH) also failed to cross the threshold for the first time since 1990, whilst the far-right nationalist Kotleba – People's Party Our Slovakia (ĽSNS) entered parliament for the first time.

Electoral system
The 150 members of the National Council were elected by proportional representation in a single nationwide constituency with an electoral threshold of 5% for single parties, 7% for coalitions grouping at least two parties. The elections used the open list system, with seats allocated using the Hagenbach-Bischoff system. Voters were able to cast up to four preferential votes for candidates on the list of the party they voted for.

All participating parties had to register 90 days before election day and pay a deposit of €17,000, which was refunded to all parties gaining 2% or more of the vote. All Slovak citizens were allowed to vote except for convicted felons in prison (only those who were convicted for serious offences), people declared ineligible to perform legal acts (legally insane) by court and citizens under 18 years of age. All citizens, who are 21 years of age or older and are permanent residents of Slovakia, were allowed to run as candidates except for prisoners, convicted felons and those declared ineligible to perform legal acts (legally insane) by court.

Voters not present in their electoral district at the time of the elections were allowed to request a voting certificate (voličský preukaz), which allowed them to vote in any district regardless of their residency. Voters not in Slovakia on election day were allowed to request a postal vote. According to the Central Election Committee, approx. 20,000 Slovak citizens abroad have requested a postal vote - the deadline for requests passed on 15 January 2016.

Campaign
The election date was announced on 12 November 2015. On 7 December 2015, the Ministry of Interior published a list of 23 parties that registered to take part in the elections.

The backdrop of the campaign was centered on the European migrant crisis, with the governing SMER–SD taking an anti-migrant stance into the election. Teacher and nursing strikes occurring at the start of the year also had a negative effect on public opinion.

Opinion polls

Political parties

Results

Eight parties passed the 5% threshold to win seats; Direction – Social Democracy (SMER–SD) lost 34 seats, losing its majority in the National Council, but remained the largest party with 49 seats. Freedom and Solidarity (SaS) became the second party with 21 seats and Ordinary People (OĽANO–NOVA) third with 19 seats. Both performed better than their predicted pre-election polls, by distancing themselves from the previous government.

The Christian Democratic Movement (KDH) performed poorly, losing all 16 of their seats. They just failed to cross the 5 percent threshold required for parliamentary representation, for the first time since the establishment of an independent Slovakia in 1993. The far-right nationalist Slovak National Party (SNS) and Kotleba – People's Party Our Slovakia (ĽSNS) parties entered parliament with 8.6 percent (15 seats) and 8.0 percent (14 seats) of the vote respectively. According to an exit poll, dissatisfaction with corruption and social issues led many to vote for ĽSNS.

Other parties who gained representation in parliament include Most–Híd, We Are Family, and Network (the latter two being new parties with their first ever representation in parliament). Overall voter turnout was 59.8 percent.

Twelve of the 150 MPs were elected due to preferential voting despite being initially placed further down their party list than the number of seats won by their party; 7 out of 19 for OĽANO–NOVA, one out of 14 for Kotleba, two out of 11 for SNS, one out of 11 for Most–Híd and one out of 10 for Network.

Government formation
On 7 March, President of Slovakia Andrej Kiska invited each elected party, with the exception of ĽSNS, for post-election talks. Fico was given the first opportunity by the President to form a stable coalition. All parties, except We Are Family, had refused to discuss the possibility of going into government with ĽSNS. An anti-fascist protest was held the same day in Bratislava against ĽSNS representation in parliament.

On 17 March, incumbent Fico informed president Andrej Kiska that he would form a four-party government coalition, including Smer–SD, the Slovak National Party, Most–Híd and Network, which together held 85 of the 150 seats.

Notes

References

External links
Slovak Election Data Project

Parliamentary elections in Slovakia
Slovakia
Parliamentary
March 2016 events in Europe